Holgate Glacier is a glacier located in the U.S. state of Alaska, in Kenai Fjords National Park. It flows outward from the Harding Icefield toward Holgate Arm of Aialik Bay. Tour boats from Seward, Alaska offer tourists the opportunity to view the glacier.

See also
Glacial lake outburst flood
Ice calving
List of glaciers

References

External links
 Earthshots: Satellite Images of Environmental Change, U.S. Geological Survey
 U.S. Geological Survey: Sequence of photographs showing the 2002 ice blockage and breakthrough

Glaciers of Alaska
Glaciers of Kenai Peninsula Borough, Alaska
Kenai Fjords National Park